William Gardiner (1808-1852) was a Scottish umbrella maker, poet, and bryologist.

Life

William Gardiner was born in Dundee, at Overgate, on the 13th of July 1808.  According to Lawley, his mother sold pottery, while his father, William senior, was a weaver, gardener, botanist and poet. William junior's grandfather, James Gardiner, was also a weaver. He received little education as a child, but learned how to read and write.

At the age of 10, William was apprenticed to an umbrella-maker. After completing his apprenticeship, he joined the business of a Mr George Robertson, another umbrella maker and hosier. Umbrella-making became his primary source of income until the 1840s when he became a full-time plant collector.

Wanting to continue his education, he took evening classes on botany. He regularly visited natural localities around Dundee to fuel his botanical passion. This was early in the mornings or in the evening at the end of his workday.

William Gardiner junior died on the 21st of June 1852 at the age of 43 after suffering a fever.

Botany and bryology
The Botanical Society of Edinburgh employed Gardiner in 1838 to collect Alpine plants in Scotland. Around this time, the Botanical Society of London also employed him as a plant collector. In 1844 he left George Robertson's company and worked as a paid botanical collector, working for both institutions and individuals alike.

According to Leisure & Culture Dundee, Sir William J Hooker offered Gardiner a botanical appointment, which he declined due to family commitments.

In the United Kingdom, Gardiner's specimens are cared for at the Natural History Museum in London,  the Royal Botanic Gardens, Kew Herbarium,  the Department of Biological Sciences, Dundee University, Hull University, the Bromfield Herbarium, and the Hancock Museum in Newcastle upon Tyne. Elsewhere in the world, The University and Jepson Herbaria at the University of California, Berkeley, the Muséum national d'Histoire naturelle and the National Herbarium of Victoria, Royal Botanic Gardens Victoria also hold his specimens.

Standard author abbreviation

Further reading

By William Gardiner
 Gems of Poesy  Mar. 1834-Mar. 1836 Manuscript at the Dundee District Central Library, The Wellgate, D22012, Lamb Collection.
 The Wreathe of Wild Flowers Mar. 1834-Apr. 1836. Manuscript at the Dundee District Central Library, The Wellgate, D22011.
 To the Laced-winged Fly, poem read during a lecture ‘On the Transformation of Insects,’ given on March 9, 1836.
 Twenty Lessons on British Mosses ; Or First Steps to a Knowledge of that Beautiful Tribe of Plants. Longman, Brown, Green, and Longmans, 1847.
 Flora of Forfarshire. Longman, Brown, Green, and Longmans, 1848.
 Twenty Lessons on British Mosses: The Second Series. Longman, Brown, Green, and Longmans, 1849.

By others
 Amalia Diaz, Jessica Wigley, George Yatskievych. Integrating a historical and botanical work into modern collections and public platforms: The Flora of Forfarshire. Plant Resources Center, The University of Texas at Austin, 2017.
 Killian Dunne 48 right curly brackets taken from William Gardiner’s Herbarium volumes Made for the exhibition "Tales of The Unexpected",  held at The Lamb Gallery from August - October 2022. Includes photographs from Gardiner's handwritten A selection of indigenous Scottish plants.
 Mark Lawley. A social and biographical history of British and Irish field bryologists: William Gardiner (1808-1852)
 Jessica Wigley. Flora of Forfarshire: Table with updated plant names, localities, coordinates, and links to the pages in the main book and supplementary volume.

Online bryological and herbarium resources
 Flora of Forfarshire Collections at the University of Texas Libraries.
 Charterhouse School Herbarium (GOD), University of California, Berkeley. Botanists: William Gardiner 1809-1852
 Herbaria @ Home Collector Search: William Gardiner
 Leisure & Culture Dundee William Gardiner: Botanist
 William Gardiner and the Flora of Forfarshire (Video)
 Bionomia profile.

References

Botanists with author abbreviations
Scottish botanists
Scottish poets
19th-century poets
1808 births
1852 deaths
19th-century Scottish people
19th-century British botanists
Plant collectors
Scottish gardeners